Vladimir Popović (17 August 1935 – 12 May 1981) was a famous Yugoslavian actor. He was also credited as Vlada Popović and Vlado Popović.

Filmography
Subotom uvece (1957)
Licem u lice (1963) .... Radovan
Mars na Drinu (1964) .... Porucnik Miloje
Inspektor (1965) 
 The Treasure of the Aztecs (1965)
The Pyramid of the Sun God (1965) .... Black Deer
Njen prvi caj (1966) (TV) 
Arsenik i stare cipke (1967) (TV) .... Johnatan
Koktel (1967) (TV) 
Simon (1967) (TV) 
Pozicioni rat ljubavnih generala (1967) (TV) 
Quo vadis Zivorade (1968) 
Sile (1968) (TV) 
Kreitserova sonata (1969) (TV) 
Sramno leto (1969) 
Svi dani u jednom (1969) 
Cudešan svet Horasa Forda (1969) (TV) 
Slucaj Openhajmer (1970) (TV) .... Lord Harrison
"Deset zapovesti" (1970) TV Series .... Sneškin verenik
"Rodaci" .... Prvi rodjak (2 episodes, 1970)
Hocu da se ženim (1970) TV Episode .... Prvi rodak
Rodaci na sve strane (1970) TV Episode .... Prvi rodak
Sudenje Floberu (1971) (TV) 
Sve ce to narod pozlatiti (1971) (TV) 
Don Kihot i Sanco Pansa (1971) (TV) .... Don Kihot
Nirnberski epilog (1971) (TV) 
Paljenje rajhstaga (1972) (TV) 
Sarajevski atentat (1972) (TV) 
Naperekor vesmu (1972) .... Bischof Peter I.
Strah (1972) 
Siroti Mali hrcki (1973) (TV) .... Predsednik vlade
Svadba (1973) 
Battle of Sutjeska (1973) 
Ping bez ponga (1974) (TV) 
Okovani soferi (1975) 
Naviko (1975) 
Permission to Kill (1975) .... Kostas
Devojacki most (1976) .... Relja
Povratak otpisanih (1976) 
Vagon Li (1976) .... Brana Mitic
Prvi garnizon (1976) 
Povratak otpisanih" (1 episode, 1978).... Uca
Covjek koga treba ubiti (1979)

External links

1935 births
1981 deaths
Montenegrin male actors
Yugoslav male film actors
Yugoslav male television actors